Richard de Mos (born 5 May 1976) is a Dutch politician and teacher who served as a member of the House of Representatives for the Party for Freedom (PVV) from 1 September 2009 to 20 September 2012. He sat on the municipal council of The Hague from 11 March 2010 to 7 June 2018, when he became an alderman in the municipal executive for the Groep de Mos/Hart voor Den Haag. He was removed through a motion of no confidence on 16 October 2019 and regained his seat in the municipal council the following 7 November. He was the lijsttrekker for Code Orange (CO) in the 2021 general election.

Biography

Early career
A native of Delft, De Mos grew up in Hook of Holland. He taught in a primary school in the Spoorwijk neighbourhood in The Hague. In the 2006 general election, he was placed tenth place on the Party for Freedom list. In 2007, he became policy officer of Martin Bosma, a member of the House of Representatives for the PVV.

House of Representatives
De Mos became a member of the House of Representatives in 2009, succeeding Barry Madlener, who had been elected into the European Parliament. In the House of Representatives, he focused on matters of environmental policy, climate change, waterways, day care and taxicab policy. Although reelected in 2010, De Mos was not selected to contest in the 2012 general election by party leader Geert Wilders.

In the 2021 general election, De Mos attempted to return to the House of Representatives as lijsttrekker of the party Code Orange. Receiving 0.4% of the vote, the party did not win any seats. In August 2021, he became a member of Belang van Nederland founded by former FvD politician Wybren van Haga.

Local politics in The Hague
On 11 March 2010, he became a member of the municipal council of The Hague, initially for the Party for Freedom, later as an Independent. He contested in the 2014 municipal election under Groep De Mos/Ouderenpartij, which won three seats in the municipal council.

His party, renamed Groep de Mos/Hart voor Den Haag in 2017, grew to eight seats in the 2018 municipal election, becoming the largest party. He subsequently became First Deputy Mayor of The Hague and alderman for economic affairs, sport and public space. On 1 October 2019, his offices were raided by the Dutch intelligence police as part of an investigation into alleged corruption. He was subsequently removed from office through a motion of no confidence. He called his political fall a "mini-coup". The title of First Deputy Mayor of The Hague went to Second Deputy Mayor Boudewijn Revis.

References

External links
  Parlement.com biography

1976 births
Living people
Dutch educators
Aldermen of The Hague
Members of the House of Representatives (Netherlands)
Municipal councillors of The Hague
Party for Freedom politicians
People from Delft
People from Hook of Holland
21st-century Dutch politicians